Ācārya Bhadrabāhu (c. 367 – c. 298 BC) was, according to the Digambara sect of Jainism, the last Shruta Kevalin (all knowing by hearsay, that is indirectly) in Jainism . He was the last acharya of the undivided Jain sangha. He was the spiritual teacher of Chandragupta Maurya, the founder of Maurya Empire.

According to the Digambara sect of Jainism, there were five Shruta Kevalins in Jainism – Govarddhana Mahamuni, Vishnu, Nandimitra, Aparajita and Bhadrabahu.

Early life

Bhadrabahu was born in Pundravardhana (The region mainly consisted of parts of the Northern West Bengal and North-Western Bangladesh, i.e., parts of North Bengal) to a Brahmin family during which time the secondary capital of the Mauryas was Ujjain. When he was seven, Govarddhana Mahamuni predicted that he will be the last Shruta Kevali and took him along for his initial education. According to Śvētāmbara tradition, he lived from 433 BC to 357 BC. Digambara tradition dates him to have died in 365 BC. Natubhai Shah dated him from 322 to 243 BC.

Yasobhadra (351-235 BC), leader of the religious order reorganised by Mahavira, had two principle disciples, Sambhutavijaya (347-257 BC) and Bhadrabahu. After his death the religious order was divided in two lineages lead by Sambhutivijaya and Bhadrabahu.

Ascetic life & Explanation of Sixteen Dreams of Chandragupta 

On the night of full moon in the month of Kartik, Chandragupta Maurya (founder and ruler of Maurya Empire) saw sixteen dreams, which were then explained to him by Acharya Bhadrabahu.

Bhadrabahu was in Nepal for a 12-year penitential vow when the Pataliputra conference took place in 300 BC to put together the Jain canon anew. Bhadrabahu decided the famine would make it harder for monks to survive and migrated with a group of twelve thousand disciples to South India, bringing with him Chandragupta, turned Digambar monk.

According to the inscriptions at Shravanabelgola, Bhadrabahu died after taking the vow of sallekhana (Fast until death).

Works
According to Svetambaras, Bhadrabahu was the author of Kalpa Sūtra, four Chedda sutras, commentaries on ten scriptures, Bhadrabahu Samhita and Vasudevcharita.

Legacy
Bhadrabahu was the last acharya of the undivided Jain sangha. After him, the Sangha split into two separate teacher-student lineages of monks. Digambara monks belong to the lineage of Acharya Vishakha and Svetambara monks follow the tradition of Acharya Sthulabhadra. Kalpasutra mentions Godasa as his chief disciple who founded Godasa Gana.

Regarding the inscriptions describing the relation of Bhadrabahu and Chandragupta Maurya, Radha Kumud Mookerji writes,

Bhadrabahu-charitra was written by Ratnanandi of about 1450 AD.

References

Citations

Sources

External links

430s BC births
350s BC deaths
Digambara Acharyas
Indian Jain monks
5th-century BC Indian Jains
5th-century BC Jain monks
5th-century BC Indian monks
4th-century BC Indian Jains
4th-century BC Jain monks
4th-century BC Indian monks
Ancient Indian writers
Bengali writers
5th-century BC Indian writers
4th-century BC Indian writers
Jain acharyas